Walter Fabián Assmann (born 23 March 1986) is an Argentine professional footballer who plays as a goalkeeper.

Career 
Born in Zárate, Assmann made his debut on 21 April 2007, and played two more games in the 2007 Clasura competition. For the 2007 Apertura competition he wears the number 1 shirt, inheriting the starting goalkeeper position from Oscar Ustari, who left Independiente for Spanish La Liga side Getafe CF at the start of the 2007-08 season.

On August 2009, he was loaned to Spanish club UD Las Palmas. The Argentine goalkeeper returned to Independiente in July 2010.

Honours
Independiente
 Copa Sudamericana: 2010

References

External links
 Profile at Vélez Sarsfield's official website 
 Argentine Primera statistics at Fútbol XXI  
 

1986 births
Argentine people of German descent
Argentine footballers
Association football goalkeepers
Argentine expatriate footballers
People from Zárate, Buenos Aires
Sportspeople from Buenos Aires Province
Living people
Club Atlético Independiente footballers
UD Las Palmas players
Club Atlético Vélez Sarsfield footballers
C.F. Mérida footballers
Quilmes Atlético Club footballers
Club Agropecuario Argentino players
Aldosivi footballers
Defensores de Belgrano footballers
Argentine Primera División players
Argentine expatriate sportspeople in Spain
Expatriate footballers in Spain